Troop Comforts Limited (TCL) is an Indian state-owned defence company, headquartered in Kanpur, India established in 2021 as part of the restructuring and corporatisation of the Ordnance Factory Board into seven different Public Sector Undertakings. It is involved in the manufacture of Life cycle clothing , Extreme cold climate clothing, Mountaineering equipment, Supply drop equipment, Water storage equipment, Weather covers and tentages etc for Indian Armed Forces and civilian use.

TCL consists of the following four factories of the erstwhile Ordnance Factory Board:

See also
Other PSUs formed from Ordnance Factory Board:-
Advanced Weapons and Equipment India Limited (AWE), Kanpur
Armoured Vehicles Nigam Limited (AVANI), Chennai
Gliders India Limited (GIL), Kanpur
India Optel Limited (IOL), Dehradun
Munitions India Limited (MIL), Pune
Yantra India Limited (YIL), Nagpur

References

Defence companies of India
Government-owned companies of India
Indian companies established in 2021